Mark Beech may refer to:
Mark Beech (writer), British writer and rock critic 
Markbeech or Mark Beech, a village in Kent, England

See also 
Mark Beach (born 1962), British theologian

Beech, Mark